Carácuaro is a municipality in the Mexican state of Michoacán, located  south of the state capital of Morelia.

Geography
It borders the municipalities of Nocupétaro to the west, Madero to the north, Tiquicheo to the east, Huetamo to the south and Turicato to the southwest.

Carácuaro is located in the southern foothills of the Trans-Mexican Volcanic Belt, in the Balsas River basin. Tropical forests of parota and tepeguaje cover 66% of the municipality.

Carácuaro's climate is tropical with rain in the summer.

History
Prior to the arrival of the Spanish, Carácuaro was a small Chichimeca village. The place name derives from the Chichimeca word carakua, "place of the slope" or "place on the slope." The Spanish founded a mission in Carácuaro in 1581. Originally a meat production centre for the towns of the Bajío, it eventually became a centre of tropical fruit and sugarcane cultivation. José María Morelos served as the parish priest from 1799 until 1810, when he joined the rebels in the Mexican War of Independence. Carácuaro's significance declined after the war, despite it becoming a municipality on 1 February 1856. After the Mexican Revolution, emigration to central Mexico and the United States became common.

Administration
The municipal government comprises a president, a councillor (Spanish: síndico), and seven trustees (regidores), four elected by relative majority and three by proportional representation. The current president of the municipality is Walter Gómez Gutiérrez.

Demographics
In the 2010 Mexican Census, the municipality of Carácuaro recorded a population of 9212 inhabitants living in 2238 households. The 2015 Intercensal Survey estimated a population of 9485 inhabitants in Carácuaro.

There are 176 localities in the municipality, of which only the municipal seat, known as Carácuaro de Morelos, is classified as urban. It recorded a population of 3653 inhabitants in the 2010 Census.

Economy
The main economic activities in Carácuaro are farming and livestock production. The main crops grown are corn and sesame, while beef cattle and pigs are the main livestock raised.

Culture
The Señor de Carácuaro or the Black Christ of Carácuaro is a large dark-coloured statue of Christ in the church of Saint Augustine. Many miracles have been attributed to it and it is the destination of a popular pilgrimage route from Tacámbaro that takes place in the week around Ash Wednesday.

The house where José María Morelos lived has been preserved as a library.

References

Further reading

Municipalities of Michoacán
1856 establishments in Mexico
States and territories established in 1856